Jorge David Lendeborg Jr. (born January 21, 1996) is a Dominican actor.

Early life
Lendeborg was born in Santo Domingo in the Dominican Republic, and moved to Miami, Florida at around age four.

Career
He made his theatrical acting debut in the 2016 film, The Land. Since then, he has appeared in the Marvel Cinematic Universe superhero films Spider-Man: Homecoming (2017) and Spider-Man: Far From Home (2019), the romantic comedy Love, Simon (2018), and the Transformers spin off Bumblebee (2018), in which he starred as Memo opposite Hailee Steinfeld. Lendeborg also appeared in the James Cameron-produced Robert Rodriguez movie Alita: Battle Angel. He featured as a recurring character, Jah Son, in Hulu's Wu-Tang: An American Saga (2019).

Filmography

Film

Television

References

External links 
 
 

1996 births
Living people
American male film actors
American male television actors
Dominican Republic emigrants to the United States
Dominican Republic male film actors
Dominican Republic male television actors
Hispanic and Latino American male actors
21st-century American male actors